Pehtwine ("Friend of the Picts"; died 776 × 777) was an 8th-century Anglo-Saxon Bishop of Whithorn, in Scotland. The Anglo-Saxon Chronicle records his consecration as bishop at a place called Ælfetee; the consecration was perhaps conducted by Egbert, Archbishop of York. The same source(s) inform us that he died in either 776 or 777, on the "thirteenth before the Kalends of October", i.e. on 19 September; it also says he was bishop for 14 winters.

Notes

References
 Anderson, Alan Orr (ed.), Scottish Annals from English Chroniclers: AD 500–1286, (London, 1908), republished, Marjorie Anderson (ed.) (Stamford, 1991)
 Bateson, Mary, "Pehtwine  (d. 776/7)", rev. Marios Costambeys, Oxford Dictionary of National Biography, Oxford University Press, 2004 , accessed 1 Oct 2007

External links
 
 http://asc.jebbo.co.uk

770s deaths
Anglo-Saxon bishops of Whithorn
8th-century Scottish bishops
Year of birth unknown